Cleiton Cezario Abrão (born 8 September 1989) is a Brazilian middle-distance runner competing primarily in the 800 metres. He represented his country at the 2015 World Championships in Beijing without advancing from the first round.

His personal best in the event is 1:45.59 set in São Paulo in 2014.

Competition record

References

Living people
1989 births
Place of birth missing (living people)
Brazilian male middle-distance runners
World Athletics Championships athletes for Brazil
Pan American Games athletes for Brazil
Athletes (track and field) at the 2015 Pan American Games
20th-century Brazilian people
21st-century Brazilian people